This is a list of 212 species in Leuctra, a genus of rolled-winged stoneflies in the family Leuctridae.

Leuctra species

 Leuctra aculeata Zwick, P., 1982 c g
 Leuctra aegaeica Pardo & P. Zwick, 1993 c g
 Leuctra alabama James, 1974 i c g
 Leuctra albida Kempny, 1899 c g
 Leuctra alexanderi Hanson, 1941 i c g
 Leuctra alosi Navás, 1919 c g
 Leuctra alpina Kühtreiber, 1934 c g
 Leuctra alta James, 1974 i c g
 Leuctra alticola Despax, 1929 c g
 Leuctra ameliae Vinçon & Ravizza, 1996 c g
 Leuctra anatolica Kazanci, 1986 c g
 Leuctra andalusiaca Aubert, 1962 c g
 Leuctra annae Consiglio, 1975 c g
 Leuctra antalyana Vinçon & Sivec, 2001 c g
 Leuctra apenninicola Ravizza, C., 1988 c g
 Leuctra aptera Kacanski & P. Zwick, 1970 c g
 Leuctra archimedis Consiglio, 1968 c g
 Leuctra ariega Pardo & Vinçon, 1995 c g
 Leuctra armata Kempny, 1899 c g
 Leuctra artvinensis Vinçon & Sivec, 2001 c g
 Leuctra aspoeckorum Theischinger, 1976 c g
 Leuctra astridae Graf, 2005 c g
 Leuctra auberti Ravizza, C. & Ravizza Dematteis, 1985 c g
 Leuctra auriensis Membiela, 1989 c g
 Leuctra aurita Navás, 1919 c g
 Leuctra austriaca Aubert, 1954 c g
 Leuctra autumnalis Aubert, 1948 c g
 Leuctra baddecka Ricker, 1965 i c g
 Leuctra balcanica Raušer, 1965 c g
 Leuctra balearica Pardo & P. Zwick, 1993 c g
 Leuctra berthelemyi Zwick, P. & Vinçon, 1993 c g
 Leuctra besucheti Aubert, 1962 c g
 Leuctra bidula Aubert, 1962 c g
 Leuctra biloba Claassen, 1923 i c g
 Leuctra boluensis Kazanci, 1999 c g
 Leuctra boreoni Aubert, 1962 c g
 Leuctra bozi Vinçon & Sivec, 2001 c g
 Leuctra brachyptera Kazanci, 1985 c g
 Leuctra braueri Kempny, 1898 c g
 Leuctra brevipennis Ravizza, C., 1978 c g
 Leuctra bronislawi Sowa, 1970 c g
 Leuctra brunnea Provancher, 1878 c
 Leuctra budtzi Esben-Petersen, 1912 c g
 Leuctra canavensis Ravizza, C. & Ravizza Dematteis, 1992 c g
 Leuctra candiae Zwick, P., 1978 c g
 Leuctra caprai Festa, 1939 c g
 Leuctra carolinensis Claassen, 1923 i c g
 Leuctra carpathica Kis, 1966 c g
 Leuctra castillana Aubert, 1956 c g
 Leuctra cazorlana Aubert, 1962 c g
 Leuctra cedrus Vinçon, Dia & Sivec, 2014 c g
 Leuctra cingulata Kempny, 1899 c g
 Leuctra clerguae Vinçon & Pardo, 1994 c g
 Leuctra colemanorum Harrison, A.B. & Stark, 2010 c g
 Leuctra collaris Martynov, 1928 c g
 Leuctra concii Consiglio, 1958 c g
 Leuctra costai Aubert, 1953 c g
 Leuctra cottaquilla James, 1974 i c g
 Leuctra cretica Zwick, P., 1978 c g
 Leuctra crimeana Zhiltzova, 1967 c g
 Leuctra crossi James, 1974 i c g
 Leuctra cypria Zwick, P., 1978 c g
 Leuctra cyrnea Consiglio & Giudicelli, 1965 c g
 Leuctra dalmoni Vinçon & Murányi, 2007 c g
 Leuctra delamellata Zhiltzova, 1960 c g
 Leuctra delmastroi Vinçon, 2012 g
 Leuctra dentiloba Wu, C.F., 1973 c g
 Leuctra despaxi Mosely, 1930 c g
 Leuctra digitata Kempny, 1899 c g
 Leuctra dispinata Balinsky, 1950 c g
 Leuctra dissimilis Zhiltzova, 1960 c g
 Leuctra dolasilla Consiglio, 1955 c g
 Leuctra duplicata Claassen, 1923 i c g b  (Atlantic needlefly)
 Leuctra dylani Graf, 2007 c g
 Leuctra elisabethae Ravizza, C., 1985 c g
 Leuctra espanoli Aubert, 1956 c g
 Leuctra estrela Aubert, 1962 c g
 Leuctra ferruginea (Walker, 1851) i c g b  (eastern needlefly)
 Leuctra festai Aubert, 1954 c g
 Leuctra flavicornis (Pictet, F.J., 1836) c g
 Leuctra flavomaculata Mosely, 1935 c g
 Leuctra franzi Aubert, 1956 c g
 Leuctra fraterna Morton, 1930 c g
 Leuctra furcatella Martynov, 1928 c g
 Leuctra fusca (Linnaeus, 1758) i c g
 Leuctra gallaeca Membiela, 1989 c g
 Leuctra gallica Aubert, 1953 c g
 Leuctra gardinii Ravizza, C., 2005 c g
 Leuctra garumna Vinçon & Ravizza, 1996 c g
 Leuctra geniculata Stephens, 1836 c g
 Leuctra graeca Zwick, P., 1978 c g
 Leuctra grandis Banks, 1906 i c g
 Leuctra handlirschi Kempny, 1898 c g
 Leuctra hansmalickyi Graf, 2010 c g
 Leuctra helenae Braasch, 1972 c g
 Leuctra helvetica Aubert, 1956 c g
 Leuctra hexacantha Despax, 1940 c g
 Leuctra hexacanthoides Zwick, P. & Vinçon, 1993 c g
 Leuctra hiberiaca Aubert, 1956 c g
 Leuctra hicksi Harrison, A.B. & Stark, 2010 c g
 Leuctra hippopoides Kacanski & P. Zwick, 1970 c g
 Leuctra hippopus Kempny, 1899 c g
 Leuctra hirsuta Bogoescu & Tabacaru, 1960 c g
 Leuctra hispanica Aubert, 1952 c g
 Leuctra holzschuhi Theischinger, 1976 c g
 Leuctra iliberis Sánchez-Ortega & Alba-Tercedor, 1988 c g
 Leuctra illiesi Aubert, 1956 c g
 Leuctra inermis Kempny, 1899 i c g
 Leuctra insubrica Aubert, 1949 c g
 Leuctra istenicae Sivec, 1982 c g
 Leuctra jahorinensis Kacanski, 1972 g
 Leuctra joani Vinçon & Pardo, 1994 c g
 Leuctra joosti Braasch, 1970 c g
 Leuctra juliettae Vinçon & Graf, 2011 c g
 Leuctra karcali Vinçon & Sivec, 2001 c g
 Leuctra kazanciae Murányi & Vinçon, 2017 c g
 Leuctra kempnyi Mosely, 1932 c g
 Leuctra ketamensis Sánchez-Ortega & Azzouz, 1997 c g
 Leuctra khroumiriensis Vinçon & Pardo, 1998 c g
 Leuctra klapperichi Murányi, 2005 c g
 Leuctra kopetdaghi Zhiltzova, 1972 c g
 Leuctra kumanskii Braasch & Joost, 1977 c g
 Leuctra kurui Kazanci, 1983 c g
 Leuctra kykladica Pardo & P. Zwick, 1993 c g
 Leuctra lamellosa Despax, 1929 c g
 Leuctra laura Hitchcock, 1969 i c g b  (Hampshire needlefly)
 Leuctra leptogaster Aubert, 1949 c g
 Leuctra ligurica Aubert, 1962 c g
 Leuctra madritensis Aubert, 1952 c g
 Leuctra major Brinck, 1949 c g
 Leuctra malcor Murányi, 2007 c g
 Leuctra malickyi Braasch & Joost, 1976 c g
 Leuctra marani Raušer, 1965 c g
 Leuctra maria Hanson, 1941 i c g
 Leuctra marilouae Vinçon & Sivec, 2001 c g
 Leuctra marinettae Ravizza, C. & Vinçon, 1989 c g
 Leuctra maroccana Aubert, 1956 c g
 Leuctra martynovi Zhiltzova, 1960 c g
 Leuctra medjerdensis Vinçon & Pardo, 1998 c g
 Leuctra meridionalis Aubert, 1951 c g
 Leuctra metsovonica Aubert, 1956 c g
 Leuctra meyi Braasch, 1981 c g
 Leuctra microstyla Vinçon & Ravizza, 2000 c g
 Leuctra minoica Pardo & P. Zwick, 1993 c g
 Leuctra minuta Zhiltzova, 1960 c g
 Leuctra mitchellensis Hanson, 1941 i c g
 Leuctra moha Ricker, 1952 i c g
 Leuctra monticola Hanson, 1941 i c g
 Leuctra moreae Zwick, P., 1978 c g
 Leuctra mortoni Kempny, 1899 c g
 Leuctra moselyi Morton, 1907 i c g
 Leuctra muranyii Vinçon & Graf, 2011 c g
 Leuctra nephophila Hanson, 1941 i c g
 Leuctra nigra (Olivier, 1811) c g
 Leuctra niveola Schmid, 1947 c g
 Leuctra occitana Despax, 1930 c g
 Leuctra olympia Aubert, 1956 c g
 Leuctra paleo Poulton and Stewart, 1991 i c g
 Leuctra pasquinii Consiglio, 1958 c g
 Leuctra picteti Sinitshenkova, 1987 c g
 Leuctra pinhoti Grubbs & Sheldon, 2009 c g
 Leuctra prima Kempny, 1899 c g
 Leuctra pseudocingulata Mendl, H., 1968 c g
 Leuctra pseudocylindrica Despax, 1929 c g
 Leuctra pseudohippopus Raušer, 1965 c g
 Leuctra pseudorosinae Aubert, 1954 c g
 Leuctra pseudosignifera Aubert, 1954 c g
 Leuctra pusilla Krno, 1985 c g
 Leuctra quadrimaculata Kis, 1963 c g
 Leuctra queyrassiana Ravizza, C. & Vinçon, 1991 c g
 Leuctra rauscheri Aubert, 1957 c g
 Leuctra ravizzai Ravizza Dematteis & Vinçon, 1994 c g
 Leuctra rhodoica Pardo & P. Zwick, 1993 c g
 Leuctra rickeri James, 1976 i c g
 Leuctra rosinae Kempny, 1900 c g
 Leuctra sanainica Zhiltzova, 1960 c g
 Leuctra sartorii Vinçon & Pardo, 1998 c g
 Leuctra schistocerca Zwick, P., 1971 c g
 Leuctra schmidi Aubert, 1946 c g
 Leuctra schusteri Grubbs, 2015 c g
 Leuctra sesvenna Aubert, 1953 c g
 Leuctra sibleyi Claassen, 1923 i c g b  (brook needlefly)
 Leuctra signifera Kempny, 1899 c g
 Leuctra silana Aubert, 1953 c g
 Leuctra simplex Zhiltzova, 1960 c g
 Leuctra sipahilerae Vinçon & Sivec, 2001 c g
 Leuctra stupeningi Illies, 1954 c g
 Leuctra subalpina Vinçon, C. Ravizza & Aubert, 1995 c g
 Leuctra svanetica Zhiltzova, 1960 c g
 Leuctra szczytkoi Stark and Stewart, 1981 i c g
 Leuctra tarnogradskii Martynov, 1928 c g
 Leuctra tenella Provancher, 1878 i c g b  (broad-lobed needlefly)
 Leuctra tenuis (Pictet, 1841) i c g b  (narrow-lobed needlefly)
 Leuctra tergostyla Wu, C.F., 1973 c g
 Leuctra teriolensis Kempny, 1900 c g
 Leuctra theischingeri Vinçon & Sivec, 2001 c g
 Leuctra thomasi Zwick, P. & Vinçon, 1993 c g
 Leuctra torrenticola Zhiltzova, 1960 c g
 Leuctra transsylvanica Kis, 1964 c g
 Leuctra triloba Claassen, 1923 i c g
 Leuctra truncata Claassen, 1923 i c g b  (truncate needlefly)
 Leuctra tunisica Pardo & P. Zwick, 1993 c g
 Leuctra uncinata Martynov, 1928 c g
 Leuctra usdi Grubbs, 2010 c g
 Leuctra vaillanti Aubert, 1956 c g
 Leuctra variabilis Hanson, 1941 i c g b  (variable needlefly)
 Leuctra vesulensis Ravizza, C. & Ravizza Dematteis, 1984 c g
 Leuctra vinconi Ravizza, C. & Ravizza Dematteis, 1993 c g
 Leuctra wilmae Illies, 1954 c g
 Leuctra zangezurica Zhiltzova, 1960 c g
 Leuctra zhiltzovae Theischinger, 1976 c g
 Leuctra zwicki Ravizza, C. & Vinçon, 1991 c g

Data sources: i = ITIS, c = Catalogue of Life, g = GBIF, b = Bugguide.net

References

Leuctra
Articles created by Qbugbot